Masters of Mind is a 1981 fantasy role-playing game supplement published by Judges Guild for any role-playing game.

Contents
Masters of Mind is a supplement in which characters roll for basic psychic abilities, and use them to develop skills.

Reception
Ronald Pehr reviewed Masters of Mind in The Space Gamer No. 48. Pehr commented that "If you can forgive the sloppy physical presentation, and want a coherent, intriguing set of rules for including psychic powers in a role-playing game, Masters of Mind works, and works well. If you don't like the psionic rules you're using, or aren't using any, Masters of Mind is definitely what you need."

Michael Stackpole reviewed Masters of Mind in The Space Gamer No. 50. Stackpole commented that "Obviously, the author assumed that any game this was used with would have more than one attribute governing intelligence. [...] RuneQuest, TFT, T&T and Stormbringer all only have one attribute to define brains. Another case of 'any RPG' really meaning D&D."

Reviews
Different Worlds #24 (Sept., 1982)

References

Judges Guild fantasy role-playing game supplements
Role-playing game supplements introduced in 1981